Waukon Junction is an unincorporated community in Allamakee County, Iowa, United States.

History
 Waukon Junction got its start following construction of the railroad through that territory. The community's population was 58 in 1902, and 75 in 1925.

References

Unincorporated communities in Allamakee County, Iowa
Unincorporated communities in Iowa